Hassan Abdallah (born 6 July 1996) is a Kenyan footballer who plays as a defender for Bandari and the Kenya national team.

International career
Abdallah made his debut for Kenya on 11 September 2018 against Malawi.

Career statistics

International
Statistics accurate as of match played 25 March 2021.

International goals
Scores and results Kenya's goal tally first.

References

External links
 

1996 births
Living people
Kenyan footballers
Kenya international footballers
Association football defenders
Bandari F.C. (Kenya) players
Kenyan Premier League players
People from Coast Province